Sirionó (Mbia Cheë; also written as Mbya, Siriono) is a Tupian (Tupi–Guarani, Subgroup II) language spoken by about 400 Sirionó people (50 are monolingual) and 120 Yuqui in eastern Bolivia (eastern Beni and northwestern Santa Cruz departments) in the village of Ibiato (Eviato) and along the Río Blanco in farms and ranches.

Phonology

Sirionó has phonemic contrasts between front, central, and back, close and mid vowels, i.e.

Notes

References
 Firestone, Homer L. (1965). Description and Classification of Sirionó. London: Mouton.
 Holmberg, Allan. (1958). The Sirionó. In J. Steward (Ed.), Handbook of South American Indians: The Tropical Forest Tribes (Vol. 3, pp. 455–463. Washington, D.C.: U.S. Government Printing Office.
 Holmberg, Allan. (1969). Nomads of the Long Bow: The Sirionó of Eastern Bolivia (rev. ed.). Garden City, NY: Natural History Press.
 Ingham, John M. (1971). Are the Siriono Raw or Cooked? American Anthropologist, 73 (5), 1092-1099.
 Priest, Perry N.; Priest, Anne M.; & Grimes, Joseph E. (1961). Simultaneous Orderings in Sirionó (Guaraní). International Journal of American Linguistics, 27, 335-44.
 Scheffler, Harold W. (1972). Systems of Kin Classification: A Structural Typology. In P. Reining (Ed.), Kinship Studies in the Morgan Centennial Year (pp. 111–33). Washington, D.C.: Anthropological Society of Washington.
 Scheffler, Harold W.; & Lounsbury, Floyd G. (1971). A Study in Structural Semantics: The Sirionó Kinship System. Englewood Cliffs, NJ: Prentice-Hall.

External links 

 Sirionó dictionary online from IDS (select simple or advanced browsing)
 PROEL: Lengua Sirionó
 Language Museum: Sirionó (bible translation)
 Environment, Culture, and Sirionó Plant Names
 Lenguas de Bolivia (online edition)
 Sirionó (Intercontinental Dictionary Series)

Tupi–Guarani languages
Languages of Bolivia
Mamoré–Guaporé linguistic area